Vinyl may refer to:

Chemistry

 Polyvinyl chloride (PVC), a particular vinyl polymer
 Vinyl cation, a type of carbocation
 Vinyl group, a broad class of organic molecules in chemistry
 Vinyl polymer, a group of polymers derived from vinyl monomers

Materials
 PVC clothing, a fabric
 Vinyl composition tile, a type of floor tiling
 Vinyl siding, an exterior building cladding

Music
 LP Records, commonly referred to as "vinyl" because they are made with PVC, a co-polymer of vinyl chloride acetate. 
 Vinyl (Dramarama album), 1991
 Vinyl (William Michael Morgan album), 2016
 Vinyl (EP), by Dramarama
 Vinyl Solution, a record label
 "Vinyl", a song by Kira Kosarin

Film
 Vinyl (1965 film), directed by Andy Warhol
 Vinyl (2000 film), a documentary directed by Alan Zweig
 Vinyl (2012 film), directed by Sara Sugarman about a 2004 musical hoax involving UK band, The Alarm

Television
 Vinyl (TV series), a 2016 American television series on HBO
 Vinyl Scratch, a background character on My Little Pony: Friendship is Magic

See also